Trash or Treasure, later known as Treasure Hunt, is an early American TV series which aired on the DuMont Television Network Thursdays at 9pm ET from October 1, 1952, to September 27, 1953. The show was hosted by Sigmund Rothschild  and Nelson Case.

In the show, owners of collectible items would bring antiques to host Sigmund Rothschild, who would give an opinion on how much they were worth. Rothschild was a self-taught appraiser, who appraised antiques for many celebrities. The program's name was changed to Treasure Hunt in April 1953, according to McNeil (1996).

Rothschild also hosted the similar series What's It Worth? (1948–49 and 1952–53) on CBS Television.

Trash or Treasure originated at WABD-TV in New York City and was sustaining.

Episode status
As with most DuMont Network programs, no episodes of Trash or Treasure are known to survive today.

See also
List of programs broadcast by the DuMont Television Network
List of surviving DuMont Television Network broadcasts
1952-53 United States network television schedule

References

Bibliography
David Weinstein, The Forgotten Network: DuMont and the Birth of American Television (Philadelphia: Temple University Press, 2004) 
Alex McNeil, Total Television, Fourth edition (New York: Penguin Books, 1980) 
Tim Brooks and Earle Marsh, The Complete Directory to Prime Time Network TV Shows, Third edition (New York: Ballantine Books, 1964)

External links
Trash or Treasure at IMDb
DuMont historical website

DuMont Television Network original programming
Black-and-white American television shows
1952 American television series debuts
1953 American television series endings
Lost television shows